Micah 1 is the first chapter of the Book of Micah in the Hebrew Bible or the Old Testament of the Christian Bible. This book contains the prophecies attributed to the prophet Micah, and is a part of the Book of the Twelve Minor Prophets.

Text
The original text was written in the Hebrew language. This chapter is divided into 16 verses.

Textual versions
Some early manuscripts containing the text of this chapter in Hebrew are of the Masoretic Text tradition, which includes the Codex Cairensis (895), the Petersburg Codex of the Prophets (916), Codex Leningradensis (1008).

Fragments containing parts of this chapter were found among the Dead Sea Scrolls, including 4Q82 (4QXIIg; 25 BCE) with extant verses 7, 12–15; and Wadi Murabba'at Minor Prophets (Mur88; MurXIIProph; 75–100 CE) with extant verses 1–16.

There is also a translation into Koine Greek known as the Septuagint, made in the last few centuries BCE. Extant ancient manuscripts of the Septuagint version include Codex Vaticanus (B; B; 4th century), Codex Alexandrinus (A; A; 5th century) and Codex Marchalianus (Q; Q; 6th century). Some fragments containing parts of this chapter in Greek were found among the Dead Sea Scrolls, that is, Naḥal Ḥever 8Ḥev1 (8ḤevXIIgr); late 1st century BCE) with extant verses 1–8.

Verse 1
 The word of the Lord that came to Micah the Morasthite
 in the days of Jotham, Ahaz, and Hezekiah, kings of Judah,
 which he saw concerning Samaria and Jerusalem.
 The inscription, or heading of the book, conveying the prophet's authority. The word of the Lord. The expression applies to the whole contents of the book, as in Hosea 1:1 and Zephaniah 1:1. It is often used for some particular message to a prophet, as Jeremiah 1:4, 11; Jeremiah 2:1; .
 "Micah the Morasthite"; i.e. Micah of Moresheth-Gath (verse 14), a village in the lowland of Judaea, near Eleutheropolis, some twenty miles southwest of Jerusalem, on the border of the Philistine country; so called to distinguish it from Moresheth of Judah. Micah omits all mention of his father. His great predecessor was known as Micaiah son of Imlah. Micah, a villager, would be known only by the name of his native village.
 "Jotham": It is not stated in what year of Jotham's reign this prophet began his ministry, but it is probable that it was close to the beginning, A.M. 3190 [BCE date needed].  states that Jotham did right in the eyes of the LORD, yet the high places were not removed. Religion was not wholly corrupted as in Israel, yet was it exceedingly abased with their own mixtures.
 "Kings of Judah": Micah dates his prophetic office from kings of Judah only, as the only kings of the line appointed by God. Kings of Israel are mentioned in addition, only by prophets of Israel. He names Samaria first, because, its iniquity being most nearly full, its punishment was the nearest.
 "Samaria and Jerusalem": in the vision of prophecy; Samaria was the metropolis of the ten tribes of Israel, and is put for them all; as Jerusalem was of the tribes of Judah and Benjamin, and is put for them Samaria is mentioned first, because it was the head of the greatest body of people; and as it was the first in transgression, it was the first in punishment.

See also

Related Bible parts: 1 Kings 22, Isaiah 1, Jeremiah 26, Hosea 1

Notes

References

Sources

External links

Jewish
Micah 1 Hebrew with Parallel English
Micah 1 Hebrew with Rashi's Commentary

Christian
Micah 1 English Translation with Parallel Latin Vulgate

01